Hand clasping is the superposition of each finger of one hand over the corresponding finger of the opposite hand. When clasping the hands, a person tends to interlace the fingers in one of two ways. People who hold the fingers of the right hand above the left fingers are classified as phenotype R (right), while those who hold the fingers of the left hand above those of the right are phenotype L (left).

Although some people do not exhibit a preference for one type of hand clasping, most do. Once adopted, the method of hand clasping tends to be consistent throughout life. When an individual attempts to clasp the hands in the opposite configuration from the usual one, that person may feel a sense that something is out of the ordinary.

Lai and Walsh (1965) suspect that genetic factors are important in determining these characteristics. They looked at a sample of 18 families.

Based on the comparison of a series of monozygotic and dizygotic twins, Freire-Maia (1961) concluded that the preference in the type of hand clasping was affected by certain genetic factors, and (perhaps) to a significant extent.

Falk and Ayala (1971) found a significant correlation between parent-offspring and for this feature suggested model polygenic inheritance.

Martin (1975) presented the results of studies of twins and found that genetic factors are still determining the phenotypic expression of this trait.

Reiss (1999) found that 55% of the population belongs to the phenotype L, and 44% have a "right type" clasping; the remaining 1% did not care.

In support of the hypothesis about the significant influence of genetic factors on the phenotypic expression of the extreme dimorphism clearly demarcated by the data on a very wide range of variation in the frequency of phenotypes tested parts of the world's population.

R phenotype distribution

See also
Arm folding
Hand

References

External links
 http://learn.genetics.utah.edu/content/inheritance/observable/ (en)

Hand gestures
Classical genetics
Human population genetics